Tunde Adisa is a Nigerian para table tennis player of class 9 and Paralympian.

He represented Nigeria at the 2000 Summer Paralympics held in Sydney, Australia and also at the 2012 Summer Paralympics held in London, United Kingdom.

In 2000, he won the gold medal at the team event together with Tajudeen Agunbiade and Femi Alabi. He also competed in the Men's individual event, but did not win a medal.

He also won the gold medals in the individual and team class 9 events in the 2011 African Para Table Tennis Championships held in Ismailia, Egypt.

References

External links 
 
 Tunde Adisa, ITTF Para Table Tennis

Living people
Year of birth missing (living people)
Place of birth missing (living people)
Nigerian male table tennis players
Table tennis players at the 2000 Summer Paralympics
Table tennis players at the 2012 Summer Paralympics
Paralympic table tennis players of Nigeria
Medalists at the 2000 Summer Paralympics
Paralympic gold medalists for Nigeria
Paralympic medalists in table tennis